Miss World America 2016 was the 8th edition of the Miss World America pageant held on July 8, 2016 at the National Harbor, Washington, D.C. Victoria Mendoza of Arizona crowned her successor Audra Mari of North Dakota at the end of the event. she represented the United States at the Miss World 2016 pageant on December 20 in Washington, D.C. and placed Top 11.

Results

§ Voted into the Top 12 by America as the "People's Choice" (ties).

Challenge events

Interview

Beauty with a Purpose

Beach Beauty

Top Model

Sports & Fitness

Multimedia

Talent

Most Photogenic

People's Choice

Contestants
The Miss World America 2016 contestants are:

Other pageant notes

Withdrawals
 
 
 
 
 
 
 
 
 
 
 
 
 
 
 
 
 
 
 
 
  - Sameera Khan
 
  - Michaela Rose Kenny
 
 
 
 
 
 
  - Misha Kaura

Did not compete

Crossovers
Contestants who previously competed at other beauty pageants:
Miss World America
2015: : Maude Gorman (Top 12)
2015: : Amara Berry
2015: : Rachel White (2nd Runner-up)
2017: : Shivali Patel (Top 16)
2017: : Michaela Rose Kenny 
2017: : Sasha Perea (Top 16)
2018: : Shivali Patel (2nd Runner-up)
Miss Universe

 2021: : Sujita Basnet (as )
Miss America
2014: : Christina Denny (Top 10)

Miss USA
2014: : Audra Mari (1st runner-up)
2016: : Christina Denny
2021: : Sasha Perea (as ) 

Miss Teen USA
2011: : Audra Mari (1st runner-up)
2015: : Andrea Hightower

Miss U.S. International
2015: : Kelsey Knutsen (Top 15)
2016: : Dymond Elise Hayes

Miss Earth United States
2015: : Ruby Johnson (Finalist)
2017: : Kelsey Knutsen (as )
2017: : Amanda Pedrianes (Unplaced)
2017: : Annyssia Arthur (Unplaced)

Miss United States
2015: : Sameera Khan (Finalist)
2014: : Rachel White (Top 16)

National American Miss Jr. Teen
2011: : Shivali Patel (2nd runner-up)

Miss Pakistan World
2016: : Ramina Ashfaque (Miss Earth Pakistan 2017)

Miss Earth
2017: : Ramina Ashfaque (as )

Supermodel International
2016: : Kelsey Knutsen (Top 15 ; as )

References

External links
Miss World Official Website
Miss World America Official Website
Miss World United States Official Page

2016 in the United States
2016 beauty pageants
2016
2016 in Washington, D.C.